Trichilia ulei is a species of plant in the family Meliaceae. It is endemic to Peru.

References

ulei
Endemic flora of Peru
Trees of Peru
Vulnerable flora of South America
Taxonomy articles created by Polbot